An edged weapon, or bladed weapon, is a melee weapon with a cutting edge. Bladed weapons include swords, daggers, knives, and bayonets. Edged weapons are used to cut, hack, or slash; some edged weapons (such as many kinds of swords) may also permit thrusting and stabbing. Edged weapons contrast with blunt weapons such as maces, and with thrusting weapons such as spears.

Many edged agricultural tools such as machetes, hatchets, pitchforks, axes, sickles, sling blades, and scythes, have been used as improvised weapons by peasantry, militia, or irregular forces – particularly as an expedient for defence.

Edged weapons and blades, as well as other cold weapons, are associated with the premodern age but continue to be used in modern armies. Combat knives and knife bayonets are used for close combat or stealth operations and are issued as a secondary or sidearm. Modern bayonets are often intended to be used in a dual role as both a combat knife and knife bayonet. Improvised edged weapons were extensively used in trench warfare of the First World War; for example, an entrenching tool might be modified to take an edge and be used as a melee weapon.

See also
List of premodern combat weapons
Lists of swords
List of medieval weapons

References

Weapons
Melee weapons